The men's singles was an event on the tennis at the 1900 Summer Olympics program in Paris. It was held on 6 July and 11 July 1900. A total of 13 players from three nations competed, with two additional players withdrawing. This was the first time in Olympic history that Great Britain had a medal sweep in an event. Laurence Doherty took top honors, beating Harold Mahony in the final. Laurence's brother Reginald refused to play Laurence in the semifinals and forfeited; he and Arthur Norris are considered bronze medalists.

Background

This was the second appearance of the men's singles tennis. The event has been held at every Summer Olympics where tennis has been on the program: from 1896 to 1924 and then from 1988 to the current program. Demonstration events were held in 1968 and 1984.

The Doherty brothers of Great Britain were heavily favored. Reginald Doherty had just won his fourth straight The Championships, Wimbledon singles title. Laurence Doherty would later win five (1902–1906). Their strongest competition was likely Harold Mahony, who had won Wimbledon in 1896 and the European championship in 1899. Max Decugis was the strongest non-British player (and would win 8 French championships after the Games), but he withdrew; André Prévost was the 1900 French runner-up.

The United States made its debut in the event. France and Great Britain both made their second appearance.

Competition format

The competition was a single-elimination tournament with no bronze-medal match (both semifinal losers tied for third). All matches before the final were best-of-three sets; the final was best-of-five sets.

Schedule

Draw

Finals

Results summary

External links

  ITF, 2008 Olympic Tennis Event Media Guide

Men's singles
Men's events at the 1900 Summer Olympics